Neanthophylax is a genus of beetles in the family Cerambycidae, containing the following species:

 Neanthophylax mirificus (Bland, 1865)
 Neanthophylax pubicollis Linsley & Chemsak, 1972
 Neanthophylax subvittatus (Casey, 1891)
 Neanthophylax tenebrosus (LeConte, 1873)

References

Lepturinae